Ken Choi may refer to:

 Kenneth Choi (born 1971), American actor
 Ken Choi (singer) (born 1960), singer and actor from Hong Kong
 Ken Choi (windsurfer) (born 1961), Hong Kong windsurfer